Miklós Ungvári (born 15 October 1980) is a Hungarian former half-lightweight judoka who held the European title in 2002, 2009 and 2011. He competed at the 2004, 2008, 2012 and 2016 Olympics and won a silver medal in 2012, placing fifth in 2016.

Ungvári took up judo aged nine, and in October 2009 was named Judoka of the Week by the European Judo Federation. Besides judo, he competed in equestrian show jumping and was a co-driver for the Sandlander team at the 2014 Dakar Rally. His brother also competes internationally in judo.

Awards
 Hungarian Judoka of the Year: 2002, 2008, 2009, 2010, 2012
   Knight's Cross of the Order of Merit of the Republic of Hungary (2012)

References

External links

 
 
 
 

1980 births
Living people
Hungarian male judoka
Judoka at the 2004 Summer Olympics
Judoka at the 2008 Summer Olympics
Judoka at the 2012 Summer Olympics
Judoka at the 2016 Summer Olympics
Olympic judoka of Hungary
Olympic silver medalists for Hungary
Olympic medalists in judo
Medalists at the 2012 Summer Olympics
People from Cegléd
European Games competitors for Hungary
Judoka at the 2015 European Games
Judoka at the 2019 European Games
Sportspeople from Pest County
21st-century Hungarian people